Ischnocnemis is a genus of beetles in the family Cerambycidae, containing the following species:

 Ischnocnemis caerulescens Bates, 1885
 Ischnocnemis costipennis Thomson, 1864
 Ischnocnemis cribellatus (Bates, 1892)
 Ischnocnemis cyaneus Bates, 1892
 Ischnocnemis eyai Chemsak & Noguera, 1997
 Ischnocnemis glabra Chemsak & Linsley, 1988
 Ischnocnemis luteicollis (Bates, 1885)
 Ischnocnemis minor Bates, 1880
 Ischnocnemis sexualis Bates, 1885
 Ischnocnemis similis Chemsak & Noguera, 1997
 Ischnocnemis skillmani Chemsak & Hovore, in Eya, 2010
 Ischnocnemis subviridis Chemsak & Hovore, in Eya, 2010
 Ischnocnemis virescens Eya, 2010

References

Trachyderini
Cerambycidae genera